Prasat is a district (amphoe) in the southern part of Surin province, northeastern Thailand.

Geography
Neighboring districts are (from the north clockwise): Mueang Surin, Lamduan, Sangkha, Kap Choeng, and Phanom Dong Rak of Surin Province; Ban Kruat, Prakhon Chai, Phlapphla Chai, and Krasang of Buriram province.

History
The area of the district was originally part of Mueang Surin district. It was split off as a separate district on 4 March 1938, consisting of the seven tambons: Kang Aen, Bakdai, Ta Bao, Prue, Thung Mon, Phlai, and Thamo.

Administration

Central administration 
Prasat district is divided into 18 sub-districts (tambons), which are further subdivided into 241 administrative villages (mubans).

Local administration 
There are three sub-district municipalities (thesaban tambons) in the district:
 Kang Aen consisting of parts of sub-district Kang Aen.
 Nikhon Prasat consisting of parts of sub-district Prue.
 Kantuatramuan consisting of sub-district Kantuatramuan.

There are 17 sub-district administrative organizations (SAO) in the district:
 Kang Aen consisting of parts of sub-district Kang Aen.
 Thamo consisting of sub-district Thamo.
 Phlai consisting of sub-district Phlai.
 Prue consisting of parts of sub-district Prue.
 Thung Mon consisting of sub-district Thung Mon.
 Ta Bao consisting of sub-district Ta Bao.
 Nong Yai consisting of sub-district Nong Yai.
 Khok Yang consisting of sub-district Khok Yang.
 Khok Sa-at consisting of sub-district Khok Sa-at.
 Ban Sai consisting of sub-district Ban Sai.
 Chok Na Sam consisting of sub-district Chok Na Sam.
 Chuea Phloeng consisting of sub-district Chuea Phloeng.
 Prasat Thanong consisting of sub-district Prasat Thanong.
 Tani consisting of sub-district Tani.
 Ban Phluang consisting of sub-district Ban Phluang.
 Samut consisting of sub-district Samut.
 Prathat Bu consisting of sub-district Prathat Bu.

References

External links
amphoe.com

Prasat